Mirzaganj, Patuakhali is a village in Mirzaganj Upazila of Patuakhali District in the Barisal Division of southern-central Bangladesh.

See also
 List of villages in Bangladesh

References

Populated places in Patuakhali District